Rosset may refer to:

People
 Barney Rosset (1922–2012), American entrepreneur and publisher
 Clément Rosset (1939–2018), French philosopher and writer
 Macarena Rosset (born 1991), Argentine basketball player
 Marc Rosset (born 1970), Swiss tennis player
 Matthieu Rosset (born 1990), French diver
 Olivier Rosset (born 1971), French music entrepreneur 
 Ricardo Rosset (born 1968), Brazilian racing driver

Other uses 
 Rosset sheep, a breed of domestic sheep